C. Shakeela, known mononymously as Shakeela, is an Indian actress and politician who has predominantly acted in Malayalam, Tamil and Telugu language films. She is a member of Indian National Congress. Shakeela debuted in the film Playgirls (1995) at the age of 18.

Early life
Shakeela was born in a Muslim family based in Kodambakkam, Madras, India. Her mother Chan Begum was from Nellore in Andhra Pradesh and father Chan Basha was from Madras. She could not complete her school leaving certificate examination, eventually making her foray into films.

Career
From the beginning of her career, she acted in B movies and softcore pornography. One of her big hits was Kinnarathumbikal, which brought her into limelight and resulted in an unheard-of craze for her from youngsters to the old. She did a few controversial topless scenes in her initial movies until she got noticed. Her B movieswere dubbed and released in almost all Indian languages. Her films were dubbed into foreign languages like Nepalese, Chinese, and Sinhala. After she acted in several movies, the soft-porn movies in India were colloquially called as "shakeela films". Shakeela hired a body double Surayya Banu to do her topless scenes.

Shakeela started appearing in family character roles in Tamil, Telugu and Kannada language movies since 2003. She wrote her autobiography in Malayalam, which covered her family, her background, as well as her acquaintance with notable film personalities, politicians and childhood friends.

In January 2018, she announced her 250th film as an actor, Sheelavathi, would begin production.

Personal life
In 2012, Shakeela announced that she will no longer act in B grade movies. Shakeela released her autobiography Shakeela: Aatmakatha in 2013.  She also adopted a daughter named Mila.

Politics

Shakeela joined the Indian National Congress in March 2021.

Filmography

As an actress
Shakeela has featured in over 250 in Malayalam, Tamil, Hindi, Kannada, Odia and Telugu Language films in various roles.

Television

In popular culture
Indrajit Lankesh directed her biopic Shakeela based on her life in which Richa Chadda portrays the title character.

References

External links
 
Shakeela biopic official website

Living people
Actresses from Chennai
Actresses in Tamil cinema
Actresses in Telugu cinema
Actresses in Malayalam cinema
Actresses in Kannada cinema
20th-century Indian actresses
Indian film actresses
21st-century Indian actresses
Actresses in Malayalam television
Actresses in Odia cinema
21st-century Indian film directors
Indian women film directors
Malayalam film directors
Telugu film directors
Bigg Boss Kannada contestants
Actresses from Andhra Pradesh
People from Nellore district
People from Nellore
Year of birth missing (living people)